The 1990–91 season was the 93rd season of competitive football played by Arsenal.

Arsenal finished the season as league champions for the second time in three seasons, losing just one of their 38 league games.

The season began with two major signings at Highbury. After more than a year of trying, Arsenal finally landed goalkeeper David Seaman from QPR before the start of the season. Arsenal's previous first choice goalkeeper John Lukic was sold to newly promoted Leeds United. Swedish winger Anders Limpar was signed from Italian side Cremonese, quickly prompting the departure of two other players in the same position – Brian Marwood and Martin Hayes. Manager George Graham also strengthened his defence with a move for Norwich defender Andy Linighan, although Linighan was not a regular player in his first season at Highbury. Making their debuts this season were midfielder David Hillier and striker Andy Cole. Although Cole made just one appearance for Arsenal this season as a substitute, Hillier played 22 games in all competitions and picked up a league title medal.

The season began with a 3–0 away win over Wimbledon, followed by a 2–1 home win over Luton Town. This good form continued and by the end of October, Arsenal were unbeaten in the league, along with defending champions Liverpool and North London rivals Tottenham in what was beginning to look like a very exciting title race. Tottenham soon fell away in the league, however, and so for much of the season it appeared likely that it would be a two horse race for the title between Arsenal and Liverpool.

On 20 October, Arsenal travelled to Old Trafford for a league match with Manchester United, which they won 1–0, but the match was marred by a 21-player brawl which resulted in Arsenal being deducted two points and their opponents one point.

Arsenal's League Cup hopes ended on 28 November when they lost 6–2 at home to Manchester United in the fourth round. Four days later however, Arsenal beat Liverpool 3–0 in the league at Highbury, ending the visiting side's unbeaten start to the league campaign, although they did not overtake Kenny Dalglish's men and go top of the league until the new year.

On 19 December, the club was stunned when captain Tony Adams was jailed for four months for following a car crash. Adams was released after two months behind bars, during which Arsenal suffered their only league defeat of the season – a 2–1 defeat at Chelsea in their 24th game. Before the end of the February, the title race was thrown into fresh uncertainty when Kenny Dalglish suddenly announced his resignation as manager of Liverpool, who were the only remaining serious threat to Arsenal's lead of the First Division. Ronnie Moran was placed in temporary charge until the arrival of Graeme Souness two months later, but by then Arsenal were looking all set for the league title.

Confirmation of Arsenal's league title triumph finally came in their penultimate game of the season, on 6 May, when they triumphed 3–1 at home to Manchester United in a match where top scorer Alan Smith scored a hat-trick. Anders Limpar then scored a hat-trick in Arsenal's final fixture, a 6–1 victory over Coventry City at Highbury.

Arsenal had also been in contention for the double, which would have made them the only team in English football to have won the double twice, but these hopes ended in the semi-final at Wembley, where they beaten 3–1 by Tottenham, who went on to win the trophy for a record eighth time.

Pre-season and friendlies

Source:

Football League First Division

Classification

Round by round

Football League Cup

Arsenal entered the Football League Cup in the second round, where they were drawn against Chester City in a two-legged tie.

Colour key: Green = Arsenal win; Yellow = draw; Red = opponents win. Arsenal score ordered first.

FA Cup

Colour key: Green = Arsenal win; Yellow = draw; Red = opponents win. Arsenal score ordered first.

Squad statistics
Arsenal used a total of 19 players during the 1990–91 season and there were nine different goalscorers. There were also two squad members who did not make a first-team appearance in the campaign. Seaman, Winterburn, Dixon and Bould started in all 38 league matches. The team scored a total of 86 goals in all competitions. The top goalscorer was Smith, with 28 goals – 22 of which were scored in the league.

Key

No. = Squad number

Pos = Playing position

Nat. = Nationality

Apps = Appearances

GK = Goalkeeper

DF = Defender

MF = Midfielder

FW = Forward

Numbers in parentheses denote appearances as substitute. Players with name struck through and marked  left the club during the playing season.

Source:

See also

 1990–91 in English football

References

External links
 125 years of Arsenal history – 1991–1995 on Arsenal.com

Arsenal
Arsenal F.C. seasons
English football championship-winning seasons